The German basketball league system or German basketball league pyramid is a series of interconnected competitions for professional basketball clubs in Germany. The system has a hierarchical format, with a promotion and demotion system between competitions at different levels. There are currently six different competitions on the pyramid: the 1st-tier level Basketball Bundesliga (BBL), the 2nd-tier level ProA, the 3rd-tier level ProB, the 4th-tier level 1. Regionalliga, the 5th-tier level 2. Regionalliga, and the 6th-tier level Landesliga Oberliga.

The tier pyramid

Other competitions
German Cup
German Super Cup

See also
League system
European professional club basketball system
Spanish basketball league system
Greek basketball league system
Italian basketball league system
French basketball league system
Russian basketball league system
Turkish basketball league system
Serbian basketball league system
Polish basketball league system
Hungarian basketball league system
South American professional club basketball system

References

External links
Eurobasket.com German Men's Basketball
German League Official Website 
German Basketball Federation Official Website 

Basketball league systems